Orhan Çıkırıkçı (born 15 April 1967) is a retired Turkish football (soccer) striker. He played for Çorluspor, Eskişehirspor, Trabzonspor (1989–1999) and Akçaabat Sebatspor.

He made 29 appearances for the Turkey national football team and was a participant at the 1996 UEFA European Championship.

Honours

Club
Trabzonspor
Turkish Cup: 1991–92

References

External links

1967 births
Living people
Turkish footballers
Turkey international footballers
Association football forwards
UEFA Euro 1996 players
Süper Lig players
Trabzonspor footballers
Akçaabat Sebatspor footballers
Eskişehirspor footballers
Place of birth missing (living people)

Association football midfielders